Hyner Run State Park is a  Pennsylvania state park in Chapman Township, Clinton County, Pennsylvania in the United States. Hyner Run State Park is surrounded by Sproul State Forest.

History
Hyner Run State Park was the site of a Civilian Conservation Corps camp (Camp S-75-PA). The CCC provided work for the unemployed young men of the Great Depression. Camp S-75-PA was one of many such camps spread throughout Pennsylvania. The young men of CCC Company 310 worked to clear the regrowing forests of brush to prevent forest fires. They also constructed roads throughout the forests, built state park facilities, constructed bridges on the state roads, planted trees for reforestation, and cleaned streams. Camp S-75-PA was built by the men in the summer, fall and winter of 1933. The camp was in such a remote area that electricity was not available. Later, a generating plant was installed to provide the camp with electricity and a  reservoir was built to supply the camp's water needs. Much of the camp was destroyed by the extensive flooding of the West Branch Susquehanna River in 1936, but some traces remain as a reminder of the days of Camp S-75-PA.

Hyner Run State Park was opened to the public in 1958. It originally included a swimming pool and bathhouse. As well as a concession area, picnic facilities and restrooms. The camping area was opened in 1975.

Recreation

Fishing and hunting
Hyner Run is stocked annually by the Pennsylvania Fish and Boat Commission with brook and brown trout. The upper parts of Hyner Run and other small streams have a population of native brook trout. Fly fishing is possible in the Right Branch of Young Womans Creek.

Hunters are expected to follow the rules and regulations of the Pennsylvania Game Commission. The common game species are ruffed grouse, squirrels, turkey, white-tailed deer, and black bears. Common fur bearers are bobcat, raccoon, red and gray fox, and coyote. The hunting of groundhogs is not permitted at the park. Many more acres of forested woodlands are available for hunting and trapping on the grounds of the adjacent Sproul State Forest.

Camping
A modern cabin that sleeps eight people is available for rent year-round. The two-story house has three bedrooms, two bathrooms, kitchen, dining room, living room and roofed, open front porch. Renters provide their own sheets, blankets and towels. Kitchenware and eating utensils are provided. In the yard of the cabin is a fire ring, charcoal grill, two picnic tables and a swing set.

The camping area is open the second week in April and closes in mid-December, unless posted otherwise. Each of the 30 campsites has a level pad, picnic table and fire ring. The campground has showers, flush toilets and several water outlets. Garbage and recycling receptacles and a sanitary dump station are near the campground entrance. Pets are prohibited in the campground.

Swimming, hiking and picnicking
A large swimming pool is open from Memorial Day weekend to Labor Day weekend. The park serves as a trailhead for the Donut Hole Trail system in Sproul State Forest. There are 150 picnic tables in the  picnic area with two pavilions.

Nearby state parks

The following state parks are within  of Hyner Run State Park:
Bald Eagle State Park (Centre County)
Bucktail State Park Natural Area (Cameron and Clinton Counties)
Cherry Springs State Park (Potter County) 
Colton Point State Park (Tioga County)
Hyner View State Park (Clinton County)
Kettle Creek State Park (Clinton County)
Leonard Harrison State Park (Tioga County)
Little Pine State Park (Lycoming County) 
Lyman Run State Park (Potter County)
Ole Bull State Park (Potter County)
Patterson State Park (Potter County)
Prouty Place State Park (Potter County)
Ravensburg State Park (Clinton County)
Sinnemahoning State Park (Cameron and Potter Counties)
Upper Pine Bottom State Park (Lycoming County)

References

External links

  148 KB

State parks of Pennsylvania
Protected areas established in 1958
Civilian Conservation Corps in Pennsylvania
Parks in Clinton County, Pennsylvania
1958 establishments in Pennsylvania
Campgrounds in Pennsylvania
Protected areas of Clinton County, Pennsylvania